Sun Xiulan (born March 27, 1961) is a former female Chinese handball player who competed in the 1984 Summer Olympics and in the 1988 Summer Olympics.

In 1984 she was a member of the Chinese handball team which won the bronze medal. She played all five matches and scored twelve goals.

Four years later she was part of the Chinese team which finished sixth. She played all five matches and scored 36 goals, being top scorer of the olympic tournament.

External links

1961 births
Living people
Chinese female handball players
Handball players at the 1984 Summer Olympics
Handball players at the 1988 Summer Olympics
Olympic bronze medalists for China
Olympic handball players of China
Olympic medalists in handball
Asian Games medalists in handball
Handball players at the 1990 Asian Games
Medalists at the 1984 Summer Olympics
Asian Games silver medalists for China
Medalists at the 1990 Asian Games
20th-century Chinese women